Eupithecia zombensis is a moth in the family Geometridae. It is found in Tanzania.

References

Moths described in 1990
zombensis
Moths of Africa